First Baptist Church is a historic Baptist church building in Dayton, Oregon, United States.

The church building was constructed in 1886 and added to the National Register of Historic Places in 1979. In the mid-2010s, the building was restored and adapted for use as a restaurant.

References

Baptist churches in Oregon
National Register of Historic Places in Yamhill County, Oregon
Churches completed in 1886
Buildings and structures in Dayton, Oregon
Churches on the National Register of Historic Places in Oregon
1886 establishments in Oregon
Churches in Yamhill County, Oregon